The Prince of Beloozero was the kniaz, the ruler or sub-ruler, of the Principality of Beloozero, a lordship which lasted over two centuries in the north of what is now European Russia. Before 1238, it formed part of the principality of Rostov, which also included the lands around Yaroslavl, Uglich and Ustyug.  It was detachted from Rostov in 1238 when, following the death of Vasilko Konstantinovich, Prince of Rostov, his younger son Gleb Vasilkovich took Beloozero while his older son Boris Vasil'kovich became his successor at Rostov.

The princedom gave rise to the princely nobility surname of Belozersky (Белозе́рский), literally meaning "of Belo Ozero" (of White Lake).  Subsequently, the only surviving branch of this Russian Princely family (meaning direct male descendants) are the Princes Belosselsky-Belozersky.  Emperor Paul I of Russia gave this honor to Alexander Mikhailovich Belosselsky-Belozersky and his descendants.

List of princes of Beloozero
 Gleb Vasilkovich, 1238-1278
Between death of Gleb and 1302, under rule of Dmitry Borisovich, Prince of Rostov
 Mikhail Glebovich, 1278-1293
 Fyodor Mikhaylovich, 1293-1314
 Roman Mikhaylovich, 1314-1339 
 Ivan Kalita, 1328–1338, who had purchased the principality.
 Fyodor Romanovich, 1339-1380 (died at Kulikovo)
 Yury Vasilyevich (grandson of Roman), after 1380

Came into the hands of the ruler of Moscow, the Grand Prince of Vladimir Dmitry Donskoi, whose son Andrei, and his son Mikhail, remained nominal princes until its final annexation into the Muscovite state in 1485.

Notes

References
 Martin, Janet, Medieval Russia, 980-1584, (Cambridge, 1995)

External links
 Medieval Lands Project

Noble titles of Kievan Rus
Rurikids